Georgia's 7th congressional district is a congressional district in the U.S. state of Georgia. It is currently represented by Democrat Lucy McBath. The district's boundaries have been redrawn following the 2010 census, which granted an additional congressional seat to Georgia.  The first election using the new district boundaries (listed below) were the 2012 congressional elections.

The district includes portions of the northeast Atlanta metropolitan area, including the cities of Peachtree Corners, Norcross, Lawrenceville, Duluth, Snellville, Suwanee, and Buford. It covers most of Gwinnett County.

While the district had been considered a Republican stronghold since the mid-1990s, it has recently become friendlier to Democrats as a result of significant demographic changes, particularly the growth of Black, Hispanic and Asian populations. In the 2018 midterm elections, Republican Rob Woodall won reelection by only 433 votes, or 0.15%, against Democrat Carolyn Bourdeaux, and his victory was only confirmed after a recount. In terms of both absolute numbers and vote percentage, it was the closest U.S. House race in the country in 2018. In 2020, Bourdeaux was elected to represent the district in Congress.

Counties
Fulton (Partial, see also )
Gwinnett (Partial, see also  and )

History
Although the seat had been held by Republicans since 1995 until 2020, the 7th district had previously elected Democrats consistently from the Reconstruction era (1868) until the 1994 Congressional Elections.

Demographics 
According to the APM Research Lab's Voter Profile Tools (featuring the U.S. Census Bureau's 2019 American Community Survey), the district contained about 502,000 potential voters (citizens, age 18+). Of these, 52% are White, 24% Black, 12% Asian, and 10% Latino. More than one-fifth (21%) of the district's potential voters are immigrants. Median income among households (with one or more potential voter) in the district is about $85,800. As for the educational attainment of potential voters in the district, 44% hold a bachelor's or higher degree.

List of members representing the district

Election results

2002

2004

2006

2008

2010

2012

2014

2016

2018

2020

2022

See also
Georgia's congressional districts
List of United States congressional districts

References

 Congressional Biographical Directory of the United States 1774–present

Further reading

External links
 PDF map of Georgia's 7th district at nationalatlas.gov
 Georgia's 7th district at GovTrack.us

07